Masala puri, or Masalpuri, is an Indian snack which is especially popular in the southern states of Karnataka. A form of chaat, the dish originated in the Indian state of Karnataka and has now become famous in the entire Indian subcontinent. Typically spicy, the dish can also be made sweet based on the requirement.

Preparation
Crushed puris are soaked in hot masala gravy made up of puffed rice, green peas, chili powder, garam masala, chaat masala, coriander powder, etc. Toppings of small slices of onion and tomato, carrot shavings (optional), coriander leaves and sev are then added, before the dish is served.

See also
 Panipuri
 Sevpuri
 Dahi puri
 List of snack foods from the Indian subcontinent

References

Indian snack foods
Street food
Indian fast food
Culture of Bangalore